Changing of the Seasons is the second extended play (EP) by Northern Irish indie rock band Two Door Cinema Club, released on 30 September 2013. It is the band's first release since they had left Kitsuné and signed with former EMI subsidiary Parlophone.

Singles
The lead single from the EP is the title track "Changing of the Seasons". It features production from French DJ and record producer Madeon and can also be found on the 2013 reissue of Two Door Cinema Club's second studio album, Beacon.

Track listing
Digital download
"Changing of the Seasons" – 3:43
"Crystal" – 3:22
"Golden Veins" – 4:16
"Changing of the Seasons" (Monsieur Adi Remix) – 6:23

CD
"Changing of the Seasons" – 3:43
"Crystal" – 3:22
"Golden Veins" – 4:16
"Changing of the Seasons" (Belarbi Remix) – 4:06

12" single
Changing of the Seasons"
Changing of the Seasons" (Monsieur Adi Remix)
Changing of the Seasons" (Francesco Rossi Remix)
Changing of the Seasons" (Instrumental Mix)

References

2013 EPs
Parlophone EPs
Two Door Cinema Club albums